Votorantim Energia is a Brazilian energy company part of conglomerate Votorantim Group created in 1996 as part of the management.

In 2007, generated 63% of the total energy consumed in the Group, being one of the leading industrial investors in the Brazilian electric power sector. Managing energy for more than 180 company, besides the companies of Votorantim, is responsible for 8,2% of industrial consumption of energy, which equals 3% to the total consumption of the country.

The Votorantim Energia also have solutions as generation, management and marketing (buying and selling) of energy, planning energy resources, cogeneration projects and energy efficiency, among others. The company’s principal differential is have in one side one of the biggest private generators, and in the other one manages the biggest energy consumer of the country, the Votorantim S/A. 

The company manager power produced at 32 hydroelectric plants, some in consortium and others exclusive of Votorantim, with a portfolio that also includes 5 thermoelectric plants, reaching 2.586 MW of installed capacity and 5% of natural gas management of Brazilian industry consumption.

Assets 

 20 own hydroelectric power plants.
 9 hydroelectric in consortium.
 4 small hydroelectric plants.
 5 thermoelectric plants.
 1 wind power generation plant in construction.

References 

Electric power companies of Brazil
Votorantim Group
Brazilian companies established in 1996
Energy companies established in 1996